Thomas Henry Cable (27 November 1900 – 1986) was a professional footballer who played for Barking, Leyton, Queens Park Rangers, Middlesex Wanderers, Tottenham Hotspur and Kettering Town.

Football career 
Cable began his career at his local club Barking before joining Leyton. In 1925 he signed for Queens Park Rangers where he appeared in 18 matches, scoring twice. After playing for Middlesex Rangers the centre half re-joined Leyton. Cable was signed by Tottenham Hotspur in 1928 and went on to feature in 44 matches for the Lilywhites between 1928–32. He joined Southampton in 1932 but did not make a first team appearance. Cable ended his playing career at Kettering Town.

References 

1900 births
1986 deaths
Footballers from Barking, London
English footballers
Association football defenders
Barking F.C. players
Leyton F.C. players
Queens Park Rangers F.C. players
Middlesex Wanderers A.F.C. players
Tottenham Hotspur F.C. players
Southampton F.C. players
Kettering Town F.C. players
English Football League players
English football managers
Grays Athletic F.C. managers